Chilehexops is a genus of South American spiders in the family Euagridae. It was first described by F. A. Coyle in 1986.  it contained only three species: C. australis, C. misionensis, and C. platnicki.

References

Euagridae
Mygalomorphae genera